The Democratic Party of Korea (DPK), formerly known as the New Politics Alliance for Democracy (NPAD), is a liberal political party in South Korea. The DPK is regarded as one of two major parties in South Korea, along with its rival, the  People Power Party (PPP).

The party was founded on 26 March 2014 as a merger of the Democratic Party and the preparatory committee of the New Political Vision Party (NPVP). In 2022, Open Democratic Party, New Wave, joined together and gathered political new forces of various tendencies to take a big tent position.

History

Formation and Ahn–Kim leadership (March – July 2014)

The Democratic Party was formed as the New Politics Alliance for Democracy on 26 March 2014 after an independent group led by Ahn Cheol-soo, then in the process of forming a party called the New Political Vision Party, merged with the Democratic Party led by Kim Han-gil. The former Democratic Party was absorbed into the NPAD while the preparatory committee of the NPVP was dissolved, with members who supported the merger joining the NPAD individually. Ahn and Kim became joint leaders of the new party. When the party performed poorly in by-elections that July, both leaders stepped down, having served for three months. Leadership of the party was then assumed by an emergency committee.

Ahn–Moon split (2015 – 16)
The next year, at a party convention on 7 February, Moon Jae-in was elected the new chairman of the party. Moon, who had previously served as chief of staff for former president Roh Moo-hyun, was the leader of the party's "pro-Roh" faction, which was opposed to Ahn and Kim. Moon came under fire for imposing a "pro-Roh hegemony" in the party, as Ahn and Kim were jeered and harassed at a memorial service for Roh held in May 2015.

As the factional conflict intensified, the party lost support, falling from around 40 to 30 percent in opinion polls. A survey conducted on 12–14 November 2015 showed that supporters of the party wanted Ahn and Seoul mayor Park Won-soon to assume the leadership alongside Moon. On 29 November, Ahn rejected a proposal from Moon to establish a joint leadership, and presented Moon with a demand to call a convention to elect a new party leader. Moon rejected his demand, and Ahn left the party.

Ahn was followed by a number of NPAD assembly members, including his former co-leader Kim Han-gil and Kwon Rho-kap, a former aide of President Kim Dae-jung from the party's stronghold of Honam. Ahn and Kim merged their group with that of another defector from the NPAD, Chun Jung-bae, to form the People Party.

Following the defections, the NPAD was renamed the Democratic Party of Korea on 27 December 2015, and Moon resigned as party leader on 27 January 2016. Kim Chong-in, an academic and former assemblyman who served as an economic advisor to President Park Geun-hye, was appointed party leader. Kim was seen as an unexpected choice, as he had previously worked for the conservative Chun Doo-hwan and Roh Tae-woo administrations in the 1980s, serving as an assembly member for the ruling Democratic Justice Party and as health and welfare minister.

Under Kim Chong-in (January – August 2016)
Kim Chong-in viewed the pro–Roh Moo-hyun faction and what he considered the extremist wing of the party as responsible for the party's troubles, and pledged to diminish their influence. 

In the lead-up to the 2016 legislative election he deselected Lee Hae-chan, who had been Prime Minister under Roh and was now chairman of the Roh Moo-hyun Foundation as a candidate. Lee left the party in response. Many of Kim's nominations for the party's list were rejected by the rest of the party leadership, while favored candidates of Moon were ranked near the top of the approved list. Kim offered to resign in March, but stayed on as leader after a visit from Moon. Kim stated that he would continue to attempt to change the party's image, saying that the events had shown the party was "still unable to move on from its old ways".

2016 legislative election
Though losing votes to the People's Party formed by Ahn, Chun and Kim Han-gil—particularly in Honam—the party emerged as the overall winner of the election, receiving a plurality of seats (123 seats) in the National Assembly with a margin of one seat over the Saenuri Party. Lee Hae-chan returned to the Assembly as an independent representing Sejong City. Following its electoral victory, Kim announced that the Democratic Party would shift its focus from welfare to economic growth and structural reform. Kim stated that the party would also change its position to support the establishment of for-profit hospitals, in contrast to the party's earlier opposition to the policy.

Under Choo Mi-ae (August 2016 – August 2018)

2017 presidential election

After the constitutional court impeached President Park Geun-hye for bribery, the Democratic Party's Moon Jae-in won the presidential election with 41.1% of votes, with Hong Joon-pyo of Liberty Korea coming second with 24%.

Under Lee Hae-chan (August 2018 – August 2020)

2020 legislative election

On 15 April 2020, the Democratic Party won an absolute majority with 180 seats in the 300-member National Assembly with its allies. The main opposition United Future Party (UFP) won 103 seats.

Under Lee Nak-yon (August 2020 – March 2021)
On 9 March 2021, Lee Nak-yon resigned as the leader of the Democratic Party of Korea to run for president in the 2022 South Korean presidential election.

2021 by-elections
Following the major losses in the 2021 by-elections, party leadership was reorganized. Do Jong-hwan became the interim party President.

Under Song Young-gil (May 2021 – August 2022)

2022 presidential election
In October 2021, the Democratic Party nominated Lee Jae-myung as its nominee in the 2022 presidential election over other contenders such as former Democratic Party leaders Lee Nak-yon and Choo Mi-ae. Lee ultimately lost the election with 47.83% of the vote.

Under Lee Jae-myung  (May 2021 – present)
After a short non-Captain system, Lee Jae-myung was elected as the party representative with 77% of the vote. After being elected as the party leader, the party held a rally to condemn the prosecution's investigation into the party leader.

The motion to arrest the party leader was rejected by a narrow margin.

A faction friendly to Lee Jae-myung (친명) and a neutral faction (비명) were at odds over the agenda for the party representative's chaepo (체포, arrest) motion.

The pro-Lee Jae-myung faction argued that the party leader won nearly 80% of the party's vote, and that the opinion polls of the party's supporters overwhelmingly support the rejection of the arrest motion. At the same time, he criticized non-Lee Jae-myeong-gye lawmakers who agreed to the arrest motion.

Non-Lee Jae-myung lawmakers insisted that the party and the representative's problems be separated and responded, and argued that the party's overall approval rating was falling because of the party's representative.

The daughters of reform (개딸), who are called party members with a strong propensity to support Lee Jae-myeong, put pressure on lawmakers who seemed to have opposed the motion for Lee Jae-myeong's arrest. Regarding this, the party representative Lee Jae-myung requested restraint.

The current party constitutional rules reflect 70% of the central committee and 30% of public opinion polls in the party representative primary, in which delegates participate. In the competition for candidates for the Supreme Council, 100% of the decisions are made by the Central Committee. In the main contest, the final winner is determined by reflecting 30% of the delegates, 40% of the general party member(권리당원) (members of the right party who pay 1,000 won), 25% of the public opinion poll, and 5% of the public opinion poll of general party members (regular party members).

In response, the Democratic Party's Innovation Committee tried to adjust the way to determine the party representative and supreme council candidates with 100% of the party's general party member to 20% of the delegates, 50% of the general party member, and 30% of the public opinion polls in the main competition.

This was opposed by the non-Lee Jae-myung faction as a rule account in favor of Lee Jae-myung, who is gaining great support from the general party members.

Ideology

Democratic Party of Korea is primarily portrayed as a centrist party  But, the DPK is one of the two main political parties in South Korea, which has been classified as centre-left in the context of South Korean politics because it forms an opposition to the right-wing PPP.

The Democratic Party is evaluated as 'somewhat progressive', if not solidly progressive, in Korea. Due to the nature of both parties, South Korea rarely wins seats in elections except for the giant parties represented by the People's Power Party and the Democratic Party. That's why most progressive citizens also support the Democratic Party, which has the possibility of being elected, through 'tactical voting'. Since its founding, the Democratic Party has gradually moved in a progressive direction.

However, some researchers argue that the DPK has center-right policies by international standard. What the Democratic Party is considered to be 'progressive' in Korea because the country has a conservative political landscape.   In fact, in the BBC's survey, Korea's 'social diversity tolerance' was the second lowest among OECD countries,  That is why some researchers have placed the DPK's political spectrum to the right of the CDU, saying that the DPK is more conservative than the centre-right German Christian Democratic Union of Germany. Also, some members within the Democratic Party describe the party's de facto identity by international standards as 'Real conservatism' or 'centre-right'.

The DPK and DPKs major politicians show a political line combining nationalism and left-liberalism. DPK's Korean nationalistic sentiment is mainly related to liberal anti-imperialism against Japan and neighboring powers, and is different from right-wing ethnic nationalism such as Ilminism. DPK is more open/liberal to immigration, race and foreigner policy than conservative PPP. South Korean liberals, including the DPK, have traditionally supported pro-immigrant civic nationalism, opposing racism and supporting the establishment of the "immigration office" (이민청). The DPK is officially rooted in the 1955 classical-liberal "Democratic Party".

Leadership ideology change 
In the Democratic Party of Korea, the overall ideology of the party changes little by little depending on which leadership is elected. In the early days, the moderate or conservative leadership was the mainstream, but as a result of the progressives and conservatives competing for leadership, they gradually moved in a progressive direction.

During the early days of the New Politics Alliance for Democracy, Kim Han-gil and Ahn Cheol-soo performed the duties of co-representatives. They took a tough stance in relations with North Korea and pursued harmony between selective welfare and universal welfare. Because they played the role of conservatives in the party,  they faced criticism from progressives inside the party for being 'center-right', and some progressives withdrew from the party. They took responsibility for the defeat in local elections and resigned as party leaders.  Two of them, Kim Han-gil and Ahn Cheol-soo, later joined the right-wing PPP.

Afterwards, the moderate Christian-democratic Park Young-sun and the moderate Moon Hee-sang continued to serve as representatives. Later, in the democracy leadership election, Moon Jae-in won the conservative Park Jie-won He lost to Park Ji-won in the party membership vote, but won the polls and won.

However, afterward, due to the party's internal investigations and opposition from the party's conservatives, such as saying that they would leave the party if Moon Jae-in did not step down, the party leader Moon Jae-in resigned, and after that, Kim Chong-in's emergency committee was launched. Although he was a member of the conservative party, he insisted on economic democratization. However, he also later moved to PPP.

Afterwards, Choo Mi-ae and Lee Hae-chan continued to serve as representatives. All of them are on the progressive side of the party. Lee Hye-chan suggested a move in a progressive direction, The party is not a progressive party by international standards, and its policies are much more conservative than those of reformist parties in Europe, and the actual party position is 'centre-right', he said.

After that, moderates such as Lee Nak-yeon and Kim Tae-nyeon continued to hold the party leadership positions. However, after the progressive Lee Jae-myung was elected as the party's representative, the party moved in a progressive direction, to the dismay of the conservative factions.

Factions
The DPK can be seen as a big tent political party. There are politicians with various ideologies in the DPK, but they are usually referred to as figures rather than ideologies. 

, the centrist faction centered on 'allies of Moon Jae-in' or 'allies of Lee Nak-yeon' (친문 or 친낙) and the center-left faction centered on 'allies of Lee Jae-myung'
party leader (친명, 이재명계) are at odds. And although the influence has been reduced compared to the past, there is also a conservative center-right faction centered on National Assembly Speaker Kim Jin-pyo.

Progressives such as the pro-Lee Jae-myung group have high support from party members, but less support from members of the National Assembly and delegates.

In the election for the chairman of the National Assembly, the pro-Lee Jae-myeong faction won 18 votes out of 170 members, but in the party representative election, which is decided by party members' votes, more than 70% of the party members supported Lee Jae-myeong

In the centrist reformist faction, the candidates supported between the progressives and the conservatives are often dispersed. Pro-Moon Jae-in supporters support the liberal populists, such as Lee Jae-myung, while pro-Lee Nak-yeon and pro-Jeong Sye-gyun supporters support the conservatives.

Liberal populists

Social liberal populists like Lee Jae-myung, don't have clear stances on their cultural conservatism and progressivism, but support centre-left policies based on New Deal liberalism. In South Korean politics, 'allies of Lee Jae-myung' usually means a radical faction within the DPK. However, as it enters the mainstream, assemblyman Lee Jae-myung also accepts some  economically liberal positions, such as tax relief and corporate deregulation, and supports a more moderate position than in the 2017 primary. 

Historically he was evaluated as a 'progressive' presidential candidate, but now he is evaluated as a 'liberal' presidential candidate. This trend intensified during the 20th presidential election, emphasizing "centrism and civic integration". During the presidential campaign, he spent a lot of time meeting and gaining support from centrist conservatives on the grounds of centrist expansion. Also, in the presidential campaign video, the emphasis and mention of 'economic growth' has increased more than in 2017. Some columnists of the Hankyoreh evaluated Lee Jae-myeong as saying, "I should have shouted for reform and change, not pragmatism and integration," revealing regret for turning to a more moderate stance.

Lee Jae-myung is more culturally liberal than the mainstream DPK politicans. Lee Jae-myung supports passing  anti-discrimination legislation. Lee discussed the anti-discrimination law with Cha Hae-young (차해영), a member of the Mapo District Council and the first elected LGBT politician in the DPK and Korean history. Lee was pro-choice and advocated expanding the rights of abortion women in medical insurance, and he opposes the possibility the "conservative-backed abolition of the Ministry of Gender Equality and Family" (여성가족부 폐지). However, sometimes he did not take a clear position on the enactment of the anti-discrimination law, arguing that a 'social consensus' (사회적 합의) was needed, or took an unfriendly stance towards the protesters demanding the enactment of the anti-discrimination law. His position on feminism is also somewhat ambiguous, likely due to the divisiveness of the topic within the electorate.

Some LGBT members of the DPK, including Cha Hae-young, are friendly to Lee Jae-myung. The informal LGBT rights organization within the DPK are generally strongly opposed to the party's conservative wing and are friendly to the Lee Jae-myung faction, which is more pro-LGBT than the party's mainstream.

The faction enjoys high support general party member(권리당원), but not much support among the party's National Assembly and delegates(대의원). Member of the pro-Lee Jae-myung faction, Cho Jeong-sik, ran for the National Assembly speakership for The DPK and only received only 18 votes out of 166, losing overwhelmingly to his conservative competitor Kim Jin-pyo, who received 89 votes.
Because of this, some members of the National Assembly campaigned to have the speaker of the National Assembly elected by party members rather than by members of the National Assembly.

Diplomatically, they support a tougher foreign policy toward Japan, unlike centrist-reformists. They support military cooperation with the United States, but oppose all forms of military cooperation with Japan. Moon Jae-in (a centrist-reformist politician) supported military cooperation with Japan before the 2019 Japan-South Korea trade dispute, with military exercises conducted by the United States, South Korea, and Japan in 2017. Even now, centrist-reformists have a relatively moderate view of Japan, but social-liberal populists, are critical of Japan. The centrist media Hankook Ilbo described it as "anti-Japan politics"  In an editorial, the Kyunghyang media criticized Lee Jae-myeong's remarks about Japan as 'excessive claims'. However, in the Korean version of Voice of America, Lee Jae-myung showed a willingness to improve relations with Japan being comparatively more conciliatory than the Moon Jae-in presidency, but Japanese politicians did not show similar willingness.

Centrist reformists

Centrist reformists have dominated the DPK. Currently, Lee Nak-yeon is considered a representative centrist reformist. The former president, Moon Jae-in is a centrist reformist, took a culturally liberal approach to military reform, school reform, and environmental issues, but a somewhat moderate socially conservative approach to disability rights and LGBT rights. Moon Jae-in was interested in gender inequality in South Korea and supported feminism, which drew backlash from some young men who were negative about feminism. In addition, there is also a (정세균계) centered on former Prime Minister Chung Sye-kyun, and unlike the (친문) faction mainly centered on Moon Jae-in, they support conservatives inside the party such as Chairman Kim Jin-pyo and are more economically liberal than other centrist reformists.

However, there are "pro-Lee Nak-yeon" and "pro-Jung Sye-kyun" as sub-branches of Sae-ryeok called "pro-Moon Jae-in", but pro-Moon Jae-in is rather close to candidate Lee Jae-myung. Regarding Nak-yeon Lee's dissatisfaction with the DPK presidential candidate in the past, Moon Jae-in criticized Nak-yeon Lee indirectly.He also said that the "pro-Moon Jae-in" faction and the "pro-Lee Jae-myung" faction are 99% the same.

Also, factions that are friendly to Lee Nak-yeon and Jeong Sye-gyun are in a more conservative position than the pro-Moon Jae-in faction.

They have the most moderate diplomatic view of Japan, except for the classical liberals who are a minority within the DPK. Moon Chung-in, a special advisor to Foreign Affairs and National Security during the Moon Jae-in government, insisted that Korea and Japan work together to mediate excessive conflicts between the United States and China and promote peace in Northeast Asia.

Conservative

Conservatives like Kim Jin-pyo are conservative liberals, who are socially conservative, supporting anti-abortion legislation and oppose LGBT rights. He also supports economically liberal policies such as deregulation. Kim Jin-pyo was evaluated as closer to "conservatism" than "centrism" in a Korean media survey. He introduced the 'Homosexuality Healing Movement' as one of the countermeasures against the low birth rate, and was criticized by liberal media such as the Hankyoreh, saying that he wasn't any different from PPP.  He won the support of a majority of lawmakers in the speakership election to be elected as the speaker of the National Assembly.

It can also include the case of taking a christian democratic stance like former assembly member Park Young-sun. She claimed that "I was the strongest opponent of the 300 members of the National Assembly in the past on homosexuality". But now, unlike in 2016, she has no opposition to homosexuality, and in 2021, she has turned to a more moderate conservative stance, saying she supports a milder form of anti-discrimination law that adds a 'religious exception'. But she is still skeptical about queer parades.

Moderate conservatives from conservative parties such as Yang Seung-jo, Kim Young-choon, Kim Young-choon and Kim Boo-kyum may be included. They joined the DPK after taking a reformist stance in the mainstream conservative party in Korea. Inside the DPK, they are taking a relatively conservative stance, such as opposing reform bills that include operating room CCTV installations.

Conservatives in the DPK are politically at odds with left-liberal populists represented by Lee Jae-myeong and others. Whenever there was a dispute, they demanded that the pro-Lee faction voluntarily leave the party, or insisted that the party could split if it continued like this.This trend is most prominent when marking breakaways on key party issues.

They are at odds with progressive faction in the party in many ways, but tend to agree to some extent on issues related to Japan. The conservative diplomat views within the DPK are closer to the left-liberals than the classical liberals. Some of them have similarities to the right-wing PPP, such as supporting Korea adopting a nuclear arsenal, but they are not quite the same. This is because they promote policies based on pacifism on the Korean Peninsula. (South Korea's centrist classical-liberals and right-wing conservatives are anti-communists and moderately friendly to Japan). The conservatives including many reformists that were jaded against the mainstream conservatives means that they do remain consistent in their opposition of extremities that exist within Korean conservatism.

Minorities

There are several political minorities in the Democratic Party. They take a critical stance towards the party's mainstream and elite, though with little ideological coherence. They are also usually the more socially progressive members of the DPK. 

Classical liberals like Kum Tae-seop, a economically and culturally liberal. Kum Tae-seop attended the Queer Festival and urged DPK to set up a booth at the festival. However, Kum Tae-seop has left the party, and classical liberals are sparse in the DPK. Some classical liberals remain in the DPK, but they are critical of the mainstream anti-Japanese sentiment that exists within the party. The Hankyoreh (a center-left newspaper) argued that the DPK's excessive use of anti-Japanese sentiment wouldn't help in pursuing national interests.

American-style liberals like Park Ji-hyun, support the rights of immigrants, and adhere to liberal feminism and cultural liberalism. Although they are left-liberals, they have relatively weak populist tendencies and are culturally liberal-to-progressive, so there is a political conflict with the 'allies of Lee Jae-myung'. Regarding the Chaepo motion, he strongly criticized party leader Lee Jae-myung, saying that it was the cause of the party's decline in approval ratings. Because of this, we received petitions from party members requesting their expulsion. She has criticized the US Supreme Court's decision to revoke the federal right to abortion and is an open supporter of abortion rights.

People from the left-wing progressive Democratic Labor Party, such as assemblyman Park Yong-jin, voted against the DPK's budget plan, calling it a 'tax cut for the rich'. However, he has been criticised as he also insisted on reducing corporate tax.

Political stance

Economic and labour policies
The DPK supports the expansion of fiscal expenditures to gradually increase welfare alongside elements of economic liberalism and fiscal conservatism. The party supports the market economy, but also values the need for state intervention in the market. In 2020, the party pledged to implement a version of the Green New Deal to move South Korea towards carbon neutrality by 2050.

The party takes a favorable stance on government intervention in the market, while keeping some distance from labour politics and labour movements. For this reason, the DPK has been labelled as a "conservative liberal" party.

However, Lee Jae-myung supports New Deal liberalism, which is economically progressive and labor-friendly, unlike Moon Jae-in, who was a pro-Chaebol centrist. Therefore, it is actively supported by former and current executives of major labor unions in South Korea. Lee Jae-myung was compared to "FDR's New Deal Coalition" because he formed a big tent political coalition based on liberalism that brought together socially conservative people (antifeminist "Dixiecrat"), reformist liberals, left-wing socially progressives, and anti-Chaebol labor activists.

The DPK is officially rooted in the 1955 classical-liberal "Democratic Party". But the current DPK got closer to moderate Keynesian than to classical-liberal economic policy of the past.

Social policies
The DPK's social stances are inconsistent. The DPK is generally classified as a liberal political party, therefore should be socially liberal, but the party is also influenced by Christian movements, so it has some socially conservative character. The party opposed the legalization of same-sex marriage during the 2018 local elections. However, some DPK members oppose discrimination against homosexuals outside of marriage and argues that they should be treated with dignity and supported the anti-discrimination law. There are LGBT members and politicians within the DPK.

Many DPK politicians are friendly to the etiquette and Confucian traditions of Korean culture. The Hankyoreh and Hankook Ilbo, South Korean socially liberal newspapers, strongly criticized the DPK for holding a discussion on the pros and cons of the anti-discrimination law and giving anti-LGBT activists the right to speak.

The DPK's Christian influences have also been criticized by other religious groups. In December 2021, the Moon Jae-in government invested 1.2 billion won (US$1,000,000) in a campaign to promote carol music in stores such as restaurants and cafes. The Buddhist community protested, calling it a policy that gives preferential treatment to a specific religion.

The DPK's social conservatism on issues related to LGBT rights and feminism mainly draws from Christianity, but outside of those topics the DPK demonstrates moderate-to-liberal social policy. The DPK opposes corporal punishment for children and led the complete abolition of laws that justified corporal punishment for children in the past. The DPK also supports strengthening punishments for domestic violence.

The DPK views South Korea's dog meat intake culture negatively and has criticized it from a liberal perspective. President Moon Jae-in said he was considering a legal ban on dog meat in September 2021. The DPK also actively supports the rights of vegetarians and vegan citizens. In addition, the DPK supports liberal reforms on student rights issues.

The DPK's position on abortion is undefined, and varies for each politician. There are some socially conservative politicians who oppose women’s right to abortion care, but most of the DPK is pro-choice. Lee Jae-myung, the DPK candidate for the 2022 South Korean presidential election, insisted on expanding health insurance for abortion and contraceptives.

The DPK takes an ambiguous position that neither supports nor opposes the abolition of the National Security Act.

Rights of immigrants and foreigners
Most of the main politicians of the Democratic Party show pro-immigrant tendencies, and factions differences are not noticeable in this regard. DPK opposes racism and Xenophobia. The party supports immigrant human rights and the establishment of the "immigration office" They take an inclusive position for foreigners, such as supporting the 'right of foreigners to vote in local elections' who have lived for a certain period of time or more in compliance with South Korean laws, which conflicts with conservatives who insist on limiting some of the foreign voting rights.

Foreign policy
The DPK's view of Japan varies from individual politician to politician, but the DPK's major politicians view Japanese conservatism negatively. On the other hand, the DPK maintains a friendly stance on the United States. The Moon Jae-in government deployed four additional THAAD launchers in 2017, for which the progressive Justice Party criticized the Moon Jae-in administration as a "poodle of Trump". Moon Jae-in said in September 2017 in front of Trump and Shinzo Abe, "The United States is our ally, but Japan is not our ally".

According to 2021 statistics, most of the DPK supporters prefer the United States in the two major powers, the United States and China. Of DPK supporters, 12.3 percent supported friendly relations with China over the United States, but 62.8 percent supported friendly relations with the United States over China. The antipathy toward China, which transcends the political orientation of South Koreans, leads to strong pro-American sentiment. The DPK's pro-U.S. tendency tends to go with the conciliatory tendency toward North Korea. Major DPK politicians tend to seek to ease sanctions on North Korea through friendly relations with the United States. Song Young-gil, a former DPK leader, proposed to the United States to make North Korea a pro-U.S. country like Vietnam in 2021.

Many DPK members is critical of Japanese culture because it supports Hosaka Yuji's "New Chinilpa" discourse. Hosaka Yuji, a Ilbongye Hangugin and former DPK politician, argued that the excessive influx of Japanese culture such as J-pop, anime, and manga into the South Korea is increasing the number of "New Chinilpa" in the South Korea. He negatively evaluated Japanese culture, saying that this was deliberately encouraged by the Japanese government. He also criticized the "Anti-Japan Tribalism" discourse as "slavery grit" that internalized the "hate of Korean" in Japanese right-wing or far-right forces, and argued that the anti-Japan sentiment of South Koreans was absolutely justified. The liberal media in South Korea are in a similar position, which criticizes misogyny in Japanese culture, citing inappropriate sexual portrayals of young women and social oppression of the MeToo movement.

The DPK a recognizes China as a vicious hegemonic country that afflicts Korea, similar to Japan. Lee Jae-myung and other major DPK politicians criticize China for robbing and invading Korean culture. Some DPK politicians, including Kim Dong-yeon, are active supporters of VANK, which shows anti-Japan and anti-China tendencies based on liberal anti-imperialism. However, DPK officially is pro-immigration, so it opposes racism against Chinese and Japanese people.

Prior to 2022, the DPK had supported a fairly friendly relationship with Russia, with the aim of hoping that Russia would support the Sunshine Policy, it is also related to anti-Japan and anti-China sentiment among South Korean liberals. The current DPK opposes the 2022 Russian Invasion of Ukraine and supports economic sanctions against Russia and support for Ukraine, but historically, it sought to maintain good relations with Russia by favoring Russia's Eurasianism (유라시아주의) foreign policy or voting on a 'political party cooperation protocol' (정당협력의정서) with United Russia.

On February 25, 2022, Lee Jae-myung drew much criticism for criticizing Volodymyr Zelenskyy as a "In Ukraine, a novice politician of six months became president and declared (Ukraine's) accession to NATO, which provoked Russia and eventually led to a clash". On February 26, the day after the social controversy over this, Lee officially apologized for the remarks and made it clear that he opposes Russia's war of aggression and supports Ukraine.

Currently, the DPK is critical of China and Japan in support of its resistance-nationalist diplomatic views, so it takes a contradictory stance that supports both a smooth relationship with Russia and a friendly relationship with its traditional ally, the United States. They are only in favor of "minimum" sanctions on Russia to the extent that the United States demands, so as not to provoke the Unites States. Many DPK politicians also opposed Zelensky's video speech to the South Korean parliament. DPK caused controversy in April 2022 by inviting a pro-Russian professor who denied Bucha Massacre at a party forum. (This was done separately from the 'official' support position for Ukraine.)

The DPK opposes Japan's ability to fight back, strengthen its military capabilities, and revise Japan's constitution for fear of increasing South Korea's military spending. The U.S., China, Japan, and Russia, which surround South Korea, are all global military powers.

The DPK has a somewhat favorable attitude towards Israel. In 2018, the Moon Jae-in government abstained from the UN resolution ES-10/L.23 vote criticizing the Israeli response to the 2018 Gaza border protests. The Moon Jae-in government officially signed a free trade agreement with Israel in 2021. This made South Korea the first Asian country to sign an FTA with Israel. Koreans and Israel's main ethnic group Jews were victims of war crimes by Japan and Germany during World War II, respectively. Some South Korean conservative or liberal media outlets compare Koreans' historical sorrow to Jews' 'Diaspora' (디아스포라).

Reunification of North and South Korea
The party strongly supports the denuclearization of the Korean Peninsula and aims for peaceful relations with North Korea. The party also officially advocates increasing exchanges and cooperation with the North to create a foundation for reunification.

Controversy
Kum Tae-sub, who was a DPK member at the time, but had a fairly friendly view of Japan, was criticized by some DPK supporter, saying, "Do you have a jjokbari among your ancestors?" (혹시 조상 중에 쪽바리가?). In addition, Geum Tae-sub was repeatedly bullied online by numerous DPK supporters due to his Japanese-friendly diplomat, and eventually he left the DPK. For reference, Kum Tae-sub was known as the most pro-LGBT rights politician in the DPK.

On April 9, 2020, Lee Hae-chan, then leader of the Democratic Party of Korea, denounced South Korean conservatives as "Tochak Waegu" (토착왜구) in the sense that they are Korean and represent Japan, and the term has since become popular among South Korean liberals. The term was also used by key progressive Justice Party politicians in 2019. A column in the JoongAng Ilbo, a moderate conservative media, criticized the expression Tochak Waegu as similar to (liberal version) McCarthyism. In an article written in the centre-left liberal media Hankyoreh, left-wing socialist Hong Se-hwa criticized it as "government-led nationalism" (관제 민족주의) that has nothing to do with left-wing nationalism and criticized right-wing Japanese nationalism and hostile symbiosis. There is also a controversy that DPK's hawkish anti-Japanese sentiment leads to hate speech against Japanese people living in South Korea. Some major DPK politicians also use racial-slanderous words against the Japanese people. On Jan. 22, just before the 2022 South Korean presidential election, Song Young-gil said, "Defeat the Wae-nom". (In South Korea, 'anti-Japanism' is considered political correctness, so it tends not to be perceived as racism.)

Although Japan's 'anti-Korean Japanese nationalism' is caused by historical denialism, South Korea's 'anti-Japanese Koreans nationalism' is different in that it is caused by anti-imperialism, experts say that the conflict between the two countries intensifies the most when a conservative (Mainly LDP) regime is established in Japan and a liberal (Mainly DPK) regime is established in South Korea. Ian Buruma described the relationship between the two countries as "Where the Cold War Never Ended" in which the two directions were intensified by different nationalist regimes.

List of leaders

Current leadership

Leaders
 Note:  - as head of Emergency Response Committee

Floor leaders

Secretary-General

Election results

President

Legislature

Local

By-elections

See also

 2019 boycott of Japanese products in South Korea
 Big tent
 Democratic Party (Hong Kong) 
 Democratic Party of Japan
 Democratic Party (South Korea, 2005)
 Democratic Party (South Korea, 2008)
 Democratic Party (South Korea, 2011)
 Gangnam liberal (factions)
 Law and Justice - The party is completely different ideologically from the DPK, but which is considered to use anti-German rhetoric as an effective tactic for winning votes. Polish conservatives' anti-German sentiment and South Korean liberals' anti-Japanese sentiment tend to be referred to as "Victimhood Nationalism" (희생자의식 민족주의). Polish and South Koreans historically share the pain of violence and massacres by Nazi Germany and the Japanese Empire.
 Liberal Party (Philippines)
 Politics of South Korea
 Uri Party

Notes

References

External links
  

 
Anti-Japanese sentiment in South Korea
Centre-left parties in Asia
Centrist parties in Asia
Civic nationalism
Democratic parties in South Korea
Immigration political advocacy groups in South Korea
Korean nationalist parties
National liberalism
Political parties established in 1955
Political parties established in 2015
Social liberal parties